is a Buddhist temple located in the Azuchi neighborhood of the city of Ōmihachiman in Shiga Prefecture, Japan. The temple belongs to the Myōshin-ji branch of the Rinzai school of Japanese Zen.

History
Sōken-ji was erected within the grounds of Azuchi Castle by Oda Nobunaga in the Tenshō era (1573-1591). The head priest was the third son of Oda Nobuyasu, lord of Iwakura Castle in Owari province, who was from a cadet branch of the clan. Rather than build new structures, Oda Nobunaga relocated existing structures from other temples and shrines which caught his eye. Specific surviving examples include the Niōmon gate, which was originally from Kashiwagi Jinja in Kōka and the Three-story Pagoda which was originally at Chōju-ji, also in Kōka. Both structures are now designated National Important Cultural Properties 

The temple survived the destruction of Azuchi Castle after the assassination of Nobunaga in 1591. During the Edo period, it had estates with a kokudaka of 227 koku, which provided it with sufficient income to grow to over 22 buildings, even without regular parishioners. It was also supported by the surviving branches of the Oda clan, especially the daimyō of Kaigara Domain in Tanba Province (30,000 koku), who used the temple as their bodaiji from 1695. Memorial services were held at the temple on the 100th, 150th, 200th and 250th anniversaries of Oda Nobunaga's death, and the successive head priests of Sōken-ji were always descendants of the Oda clan. On 16 November 1854, most of the temple, including the Main Hall were destroyed in an accidental fire. A "temporary" Main Hall was built on the site of Tokugawa Ieyasu's residence at Azuchi Castle. This building still remains in use. After the Meiji Restoration, the temple was deprived of its estates, and fell into gradual decline.

Transportation 
The temple is a 25-minute walk from  Azuchi Station on the JR West Biwako Line.

Gallery

References

External links

 Azuchi Castle Photo Gallery at PHOTOGUIDE.JP

Buddhist temples in Shiga Prefecture
Important Cultural Properties of Japan
Oda clan
 Myoshin-ji temples
Ōmihachiman, Shiga
 Ōmi Province